Whitchurch Football Club was an English football club based in Whitchurch, Shropshire. They formed in October 1871 and dissolved in 1985. They competed in the Welsh Cup, despite being English, and were runners-up in 1906 and 1907.

Honours

League
The Combination
Winners : 1906, 1907, 1911

Cups
Welsh Cup
Runner-up : 1906, 1907

References

Defunct football clubs in Shropshire
Defunct football clubs in England
Association football clubs established in 1871
1871 establishments in England
Association football clubs disestablished in 1985
1985 disestablishments in England
Sport in Whitchurch, Shropshire
Whitchurch, Shropshire
Cheshire County League clubs